Pio Iosefo Tuia  (born 1943) has been , head of government of Tokelau, six times. The position of ulu rotates annually between the three  (one for each of the three atolls), who are elected for terms lasting three years.  Tuia served as ulu for the sixth time in February 2011. He was also the faipule of Nukunonu and a member of the Council for the Ongoing Government of Tokelau.

It was under Tuia's leadership that Tokelau became, in November 2011, a founding member of the Polynesian Leaders Group, a regional grouping intended to cooperate on a variety of issues including culture and language, education, responses to climate change, and trade and investment.

Tuia's five terms:
February 1996–February 1997
February 1999–February 2000
February 2002–February 2003
February 2005–February 2006
February 2008–21 February 2009

In the 2006 Queen's Birthday Honours, Tuia was appointed an Officer of the New Zealand Order of Merit, for services to the Tokelau Islands.

Notes

References
Governance of Tokelau 2008

1943 births
Living people
Heads of Government of Tokelau
Members of the Parliament of Tokelau
Officers of the New Zealand Order of Merit
People from Nukunonu